Mangalore Buns is a deep-fried bread originating from the Udupi-Mangalore region of Karnataka, India, and part of Mangalorean cuisine or Udupi cuisine. The buns are mild sweet, soft fluffy puris with all purpose flour and banana being the main ingredients. Usually served with a spicy coconut chutney and sambar, they are also eaten without any accompaniment. Variations of this dish also incorporate finger millet and Sorghum.

References 

Mangalorean cuisine
Karnataka cuisine
Geographical indications in Karnataka